Peh is an Indian village in Manipur.

Peh may also refer to:

Language
 Pe (Semitic letter), 17th letter of the  Arabic, Hebrew and Syriac writing systems
 Pe (Persian letter), 3rd letter of that abjad

People

People in government and politics 
 Peh Chin Hua (born 1947), Singaporean politician
 Simon Peh (born 1955), Hong Kong government official
 Ting Chew Peh (born 1943), Malaysian politician

Other people 
 Pierre-Emile Højbjerg ("PEH", born 1995), Danish association football player
 Joanne Peh (born 1983), Singaporean actress and television host
 Vanessa Peh (born 1994), Singaporean actress, model and entrepreneur

Other uses 
 Phenylethylidenehydrazine, an antidepressant metabolite
 Poisoned Electrick Head, an English psychedelic rock band

See also
 Pehr, a Swedish given name
 Péhé, a town in Ivory Coast